Seyed Ali Esmaeilzadeh Pakdaman  (born 23 August 1990) is an Iranian fencer. He competed in the men's sabre event at the 2016 Summer Olympics.

References

External links
 

1990 births
Living people
Sportspeople from Tehran
Iranian male sabre fencers
Fencers at the 2016 Summer Olympics
Fencers at the 2020 Summer Olympics
Olympic fencers of Iran
Fencers at the 2014 Asian Games
Fencers at the 2018 Asian Games
Asian Games silver medalists for Iran
Asian Games bronze medalists for Iran
Asian Games medalists in fencing
Medalists at the 2014 Asian Games
Medalists at the 2018 Asian Games
Universiade medalists in fencing
Universiade silver medalists for Iran
Medalists at the 2017 Summer Universiade
21st-century Iranian people